Zabrus segnis is a species of ground beetle in the Pelor subgenus that is endemic to Turkey.

References

Beetles described in 1864
Beetles of Asia
Endemic fauna of Turkey
Zabrus
Taxa named by Hermann Rudolph Schaum